Justin Paul Tucker (born November 21, 1989) is an American football placekicker for the Baltimore Ravens of the National Football League (NFL). He played college football at Texas and was signed by the Ravens as an undrafted free agent in 2012. Known for his near-perfect accuracy, Tucker is regarded as one of the greatest placekickers of all time. Tucker owns two major NFL records for kickers: career field goal percentage (minimum 100 attempts) with 90.5 percent and longest field goal at 66 yards.

Early years
Tucker graduated from Westlake High School in Austin, Texas. At Westlake, he was a teammate of future NFL quarterback Nick Foles, tight end Kyle Adams, and linebacker Bryce Hager. Tucker played wide receiver, safety, and placekicker on the Westlake Chaparrals. Tucker also played soccer from age 3-4 up until his sophomore year. He played in the 2008 U.S. Army All-American Bowl.

College career
Tucker attended the University of Texas and played on the Texas Longhorns football team. In 2011, concluding a rivalry that saw Texas A&M University and the University of Texas square off 118 times over 117 years, he kicked the game-winning field goal as time expired. Texas, then ranked No. 25, won 27–25.  While attending the University of Texas, Tucker graduated with a degree in Music.

Professional career

Baltimore Ravens

Tucker was not selected in the 2012 NFL Draft. The Baltimore Ravens signed him on May 29, 2012, to begin workouts and camp for the Ravens alongside placekicker Billy Cundiff. After Tucker's impressive preseason performance, he was named the starter and Cundiff was released.

2012 season
In his debut season, Tucker proved to be a very accurate kicker, making all 42 of his PAT attempts and missing only three out of his 33 field goals. During Week 3 against the New England Patriots, Tucker kicked a game-winning field goal with two seconds left, giving the Ravens a 31–30 victory and their first-ever regular season victory over the Patriots. In Week 12 against the San Diego Chargers, Tucker kicked the game-tying and game-winning field goal at the end of regulation and in overtime respectively in a 16–13 victory. On January 12, 2013, during the divisional playoff round game against the Denver Broncos, Tucker kicked a 47-yard field goal in double overtime to win the game (later known as the Mile High Miracle) and sent the Ravens to the AFC championship for the second consecutive year.

During the second quarter of Super Bowl XLVII against the San Francisco 49ers, Tucker failed in completing the first fake field goal attempt in Super Bowl history, coming up just one yard short of the nine needed for the first down. Nonetheless, his two fourth-quarter field goals secured a Ravens victory, earning Tucker his first Super Bowl ring.

2013 season

Despite missing two field goals in Week 2 against the Cleveland Browns, Tucker continued his success as an accurate kicker for the Ravens. In Week 5 against the Miami Dolphins, he kicked the go-ahead 44-yard field goal late in the fourth quarter to give the Ravens a 26–23 victory. He also kicked the game-winning 46-yard field goal in overtime against the Cincinnati Bengals in Week 10, letting the Ravens win 20-17. He was named AFC Special Teams Player of the Month for November. On Thanksgiving, Tucker kicked five field goals en route to the Ravens' 22–20 win against the Pittsburgh Steelers. He was also selected as the player of the game along with Jacoby Jones by John Madden. He brought his holder, Sam Koch and long snapper, Morgan Cox, to accept the award on screen with him.

In 2013, Tucker kicked a franchise record-tying six field goals that were the Ravens' only points in an 18–16 win against the Detroit Lions at Ford Field in Detroit on December 16, including a 61-yard field goal in the last minute. During the game, Tucker became the first kicker in NFL history to kick a field goal in the 20s, 30s, 40s, 50s, and 60s in the same game. Tucker's 61-yard field goal also set the NFL record for longest field goal in a domed stadium. He would break his own record almost eight years later in the same stadium. Tucker would finish the year leading the league in field goal attempts and makes earning his first Pro Bowl selection as well as being voted 1st team All-Pro by AP voters.

2014 season
In Week 3 against the Cleveland Browns, Tucker kicked a game-winning 32-yard field goal as time expired to give the Ravens a 23–21 victory. He would finish the year contributing 129 of the then-franchise-record 409 points scored by the Ravens that season.

2015 season
Tucker had his worst year statistically, missing seven field goals despite leading the league in field goal attempts. However, he was also one of the lone bright spots in a season plagued by injuries. In Week 4 against the Pittsburgh Steelers he would kick the game-tying and game-winning field goals at the end of regulation and in overtime respectively in a 23–20 victory. The next week against the Cleveland Browns, he kicked the game-tying 25-yard field goal late in the fourth quarter, but the Ravens would lose in overtime 30–33. In Week 7 against the San Diego Chargers, Tucker made all five of his field goal attempts, including the game-winning 39-yard field goal as time expired as the Ravens won 29–26 for their second win of the year. In Week 11 against the St. Louis Rams, made the game-tying and game-winning field goal in the fourth quarter with the latter coming as time expired in the 16–13 victory for the Ravens' third win of the year. However, in Week 13 against the Miami Dolphins, Tucker missed a potential go-ahead 55-yard field goal late in the fourth quarter and the Ravens would lose 13–15.

2016 season
On February 26, 2016, the Ravens placed the franchise tag on Tucker. Tucker signed the franchise tender on March 4, 2016, which would pay him $4.5 million.
Tucker signed a four-year, $16.8 million extension on July 15, 2016.

Tucker would kick a go-ahead field goal in Week 2 against the Cleveland Browns in a 25–20 win before kicking a game-winning 53-yard field goal late in the fourth quarter of a 19–17 win over the Jacksonville Jaguars. In Week 12 against the Cincinnati Bengals, Tucker kicked four field goals, three from over 50 yards in a 19–14 win, earning him AFC Special Teams Player of the Week. In Week 15 against the Philadelphia Eagles, Tucker tied the NFL single-season record for 10 field goals of more than 50 yards in a 27–26 win. Tucker finished the year making all but one field goal, which was blocked in Week 14 against the New England Patriots, leading the league with 38 makes. He was named to his second Pro Bowl, his first since 2013, as a result of his successful 2016 season and was named First-team All-Pro for the second time in his career.

2017 season
In 2017, Tucker completed 34 of 37 field goals and was a perfect 39-for-39 on extra points. He was named second-team All-Pro for the 2017 season.

2018 season
In Week 3 of the 2018 season, Tucker made two 50+ yard field goals and three extra points in a 27-14 win over the Denver Broncos, earning him AFC Special Teams Player of the Week. He was later named the AFC Special Teams Player of the Month for September. However, on October 21, 2018, Tucker missed his first career extra point attempt against the New Orleans Saints with 24 seconds left in the game, resulting in a 23–24 loss in a game that would have otherwise likely gone to overtime. In Week 11 against the Cincinnati Bengals, Tucker kicked the go-ahead 24-yard field goal midway through the fourth quarter of a 24–21 win. In Week 17, Tucker converted all four field goals and two extra point attempts in a 26–24 win over the Cleveland Browns, earning him AFC Special Teams Player of the Week. Tucker became the first player in NFL history with six seasons of 30 or more made field goals.

In the third quarter of the wild card round against in the Los Angeles Chargers on January 6, 2019, Tucker missed a 50-yard field goal, his first career postseason miss. He would finish the game 1 of 2 as the Ravens lost 17–23.

2019 season
On April 24, 2019, Tucker signed a four-year, $23.05 million contract extension with $12 million guaranteed, keeping him under contract through the 2023 season. In Week 5 against the Pittsburgh Steelers, Tucker hit all four field goals, including a game-tying 48-yarder and a 46-yard game-winner in overtime, earning him AFC Special Teams Player of the Week.

In the following week's game against the Cincinnati Bengals, Tucker made three field goals and two extra points en route to another AFC special teams player of the week. On November 3, in a game against the New England Patriots, Tucker missed his first kick of the season and his second extra point of his career. The Ravens still went on to win 37–20. On December 1, in a game against the San Francisco 49ers, he made a 49-yard game winning field goal in the 20–17 victory.

2020 season
Tucker continued his accurate kicking in 2020, with his first miss not coming until Week 5, when he missed a 61-yard attempt in Week 5 against the Cincinnati Bengals. In Week 14 against the Cleveland Browns, Tucker kicked a game-winning 55-yard field goal with two seconds remaining as the Ravens won 47–42.

Amid difficult wind conditions, Tucker missed a pair of field goals in the first half that hit the left upright in the first attempt and the right upright in the second attempt in a 3–17 Divisional Round loss to the Buffalo Bills on January 16, 2021. He would finish the game going one for three.

2021 season 
On September 26, 2021, Tucker kicked an NFL record 66-yard game winning field goal as time expired in regulation in a 19–17 Week 3 win over the Detroit Lions. He also broke his own record for the longest field goal in a domed stadium. He finished the game with a performance reminiscent of his 2013 one in the same stadium, making four straight field goals after missing a 49-yard field goal in the first quarter. Tucker would also kick a game-winning 36-yard field goal in Week 9 34–31 overtime win over the Minnesota Vikings. Tucker was selected to his fifth Pro Bowl following the season. On the NFL Top 100 Players of 2022, Tucker was ranked number 94.

2022 season 
On August 8, 2022, Tucker signed a four-year extension with the Ravens worth $24 million, making him the highest-paid kicker in the league. He made the game-winning 43-yard field goal as time expired in a 19–17 win over the Cincinnati Bengals in Week 5. The kick was also his 61st consecutive field goal make in the fourth quarter or overtime, which is an NFL record. In a Week 12 28-27 loss against the Jacksonville Jaguars, Tucker attempted an NFL record 67-yard field goal with two seconds left in the fourth quarter, the attempt fell short. On December 11, Tucker became the Ravens all-time leading scorer with a 42-yard attempt versus the Pittsburgh Steelers.

NFL career statistics

Regular season

|-
! style="text-align:center;background:#afe6ba;"| 2012
! style="text-align:center;"| BAL
| 16 || 30 || 33 || 90.9% || 0 || 56 || 42 || 42 || 100.0% || 88 || 67.5 || 49 || 132
|-
! style="text-align:center;"| 2013
! style="text-align:center;"| BAL
| 16 || style="background:#cfecec;"| 38 || style="background:#cfecec;"| 41 || 92.7% || 0 || 61 || 26 || 26 || 100.0% || 82 || 63.4 || 42 || 140
|-
! style="text-align:center;"| 2014
! style="text-align:center;"| BAL
| 16 || 29 || 34 || 85.3% || 1 || 55 || 42 || 42 || 100.0% || 88 || 64.8 || 60 || 129
|-
! style="text-align:center;"| 2015
! style="text-align:center;"| BAL
| 16 || 33 || style="background:#cfecec;"| 40 || 82.5% || 0 || 52 || 29 || 29 || 100.0% || 74 || 64.2 || 63 || 128
|-
! style="text-align:center;"| 2016
! style="text-align:center;"| BAL
| 16 || style="background:#cfecec;"| 38 || 39 ||style="background:#cfecec;"| 97.4% || 1 || 57 || 27 || 27 || 100.0% || 80 || 63.4 || 52 || 141
|-
! style="text-align:center;"| 2017
! style="text-align:center;"| BAL
| 16 || 34 || 37 || 91.9% || 1 || 57 || 39 || 39 || 100.0% || 90 || 62.3 || 55 || 141
|-
! style="text-align:center;"| 2018
! style="text-align:center;"| BAL
| 16 || 35 || 39 || 89.7% || 2 || 56 || 36 || 37 || 97.3% || 92 || 63.0 || 58 || 141
|-
! style="text-align:center;"| 2019
! style="text-align:center;"| BAL
| 16 || 28 || 29 || 96.6% || 0 || 51 || style="background:#cfecec;"| 57 || style="background:#cfecec;"| 59 || 96.6% || 106 || 62.7 || 57 || 141
|-
! style="text-align:center;"| 2020
! style="text-align:center;"| BAL
| 16 || 26 || 29 || 89.7% || 0 || 55 || 52 || 53 || 98.1% || 95 || 64.1 || 65 || 130
|-
! style="text-align:center;"| 2021
! style="text-align:center;"| BAL
| 17 || 35 || 37 || style="background:#cfecec;"| 94.6% || 0 || style="background:#e0cef2;"| 66 || 32 || 32 || 100.0% || 90 || 60.5 || 47 || 137
|-
! style="text-align:center;"| 2022
! style="text-align:center;"| BAL
| 17 ||style="background:#cfecec;"| 37 || style="background:#cfecec;"| 43 || 86.0% || 3 || 58 || 31 || 32 || 96.9% || 77 || 63.4 || 54 || 142
|- class="sortbottom"
! colspan="2"| Career || 178 || 363 || 401 || style="background:#e0cef2;"| 90.5% || 7 || style="background:#e0cef2;"| 66 || 411 || 416 || 98.8% || 962 || 63.0 || 602 || 1,485
|}

Postseason

|-
! style="text-align:center;background:#afe6ba;"| 2012
! style="text-align:center;"| BAL
| 4 || 4 || 4 || 100.0% || 0 || 47 || style="background:#cfecec; width:3em;"| 16 || style="background:#cfecec; width:3em;"| 16 || 100.0% || 23 || 65.3 || 12 || 28
|-
! style="text-align:center;"| 2014
! style="text-align:center;"| BAL
| 2 || 4 || 4 || 100.0% || 0 || 52 || 7 || 7 || 100.0% || 13 || 66.2 || 5 || 19
|-
! style="text-align:center;"| 2018
! style="text-align:center;"| BAL
| 1 || 1 || 2 || 50.0% || 0 || 33 || 2 || 2 || 100.0% || 0 || -  ||  0 || 5
|-
! style="text-align:center;"| 2019
! style="text-align:center;"| BAL
| 1 || 2 || 2 || 100.0% || 0 || 49 || 0   ||  0 ||  -  || 3 || 62.0 || 1 || 6
|-
! style="text-align:center;"| 2020
! style="text-align:center;"| BAL
| 2 || 3 || 6 || 50.0% || 0 || 51 || 2 || 2 || 100.0% || 7 || 64.0 || 4 || 11
|-
! style="text-align:center;"| 2022
! style="text-align:center;"| BAL
| 1 || 1 || 1 || 100.0% || 0 || 22 || 2 || 2 || 100.0% || 4 || 62.0 || 2 || 5
|- class="sortbottom"
! colspan="2"| Career || 11 || 15 || 19 || 78.9% || 0 || 52 || 29 || 29 || 100.0% || 50 || 65.2 || 24 || 74
|}

NFL records and honors 
 Career field goal percentage (min. 100 attempts)
 Seasons with 30 made field goals (8)
 Longest field goal — 66 yards vs. Detroit Lions (2021)
 50+ yard field goals in one game – 3 (2016) (tied)
 50+ yard field goals in one season – 10 (2016) (tied)
 Fastest kicker to 1,000 points (2019)
 Fastest kicker to reach 300 career field goals (2021)
 7× AFC Player of the month (November 2013, November 2014, September 2016, November 2017, September 2018, November 2018, and October 2019)
 12× AFC Special Teams Player of the Week
 NFL Moment of the Year (2021)

Ravens franchise records
 Field goals made - 358
Most points scored, career: 1,485
 Field goals in a single season – 38 (2013, 2016)
 Points scored in a single season – 142 (2022)
 Field goals in a single game – 6 vs. Detroit Lions (2013)

Personal life
Tucker is a devout Catholic and makes the sign of the cross before every kick. He is also a licensed real estate agent.

He is a classically trained bass-baritone who can sing opera in seven different languages. He has been asked by both the Baltimore Symphony Orchestra and Opera Orchestra of New York for performances in the past, although he was unable to participate. In 2015, Tucker was contracted by Royal Farms to sing for its line of commercials. During the year, he sang "Ave Maria" for a Catholic Charities benefit concert with the Concert Artists of Baltimore. Tucker's opera talents also led him through to the finals of the Most Valuable Performer, a talent show featuring talent performances of NFL players, where he won thanks to his rendition of "Ave Maria". As a result of his victory, he received a ring and won $50,000 for his charity through the Baltimore School for the Arts.

Tucker married Amanda Bass in March 2015. Their first child, Easton, was born on May 10, 2016 and they live in Maryland.

References

External links

 Baltimore Ravens bio
 Texas Longhorns bio
 
 Every Justin Tucker Career Game-Winning Field Goal | Baltimore Ravens

1989 births
Living people
American Conference Pro Bowl players
American football placekickers
Baltimore Ravens players
Bass-baritones
Operatic bass-baritones
Catholics from Texas
Players of American football from Austin, Texas
Players of American football from Houston
Texas Longhorns football players
Unconferenced Pro Bowl players